Enchelyurus ater, the black blenny, is a species of combtooth blenny found in the Pacific ocean.  This species grows to a length of  TL.

References

ater
Fish described in 1877
Taxa named by Albert Günther